João Pedro Silva may refer to:

 João Pedro (footballer, born December 1987) (João Pedro Azevedo Silva), Portuguese footballer
 João Pedro Silva (triathlete) (born 1989), Portuguese triathlete
 João Pedro Silva (handballer) (born 1994), Brazilian handball player